This is a list of awards and nominations received by Chinese singer-songwriter, music producer, and actor Lay Zhang.

Awards and nominations

Notes

References 

Lists of awards received by Chinese musician
Lists of awards received by Mandopop artist